was a Japanese poet, art critic, and artist. He was the central figure of orthodox Surrealism in pre- and postwar Japan. Devoting his life to exemplifying the movement in its orthodox form. Starting in the 1950s, he began offering new experimental outlets for young postwar avant-garde artists who lacked opportunities for presenting their work in formats other than group exhibitions.

List of works

Books of poetry
 , 1937
 , 1967

References

People from Toyama Prefecture
1936 births
1979 deaths
20th-century Japanese poets